Roberta "Bobby Lou" Klatzky is a Professor of Psychology at Carnegie Mellon University (CMU). She specializes in human perception and cognition, particularly relating to visual and non-visual perception and representation of space and geometric shapes. Klatzky received a B.A. in mathematics from the University of Michigan in 1968 and a Ph.D in psychology from Stanford University in 1972. She has done extensive research on human haptic and visual object recognition, navigation under visual and nonvisual guidance, and perceptually guided action.

Her work has an application to navigation aids for the blind, haptic interfaces, exploratory robotics, teleoperation, and virtual environments. Specifically, alongside Jack Loomis and the late Reginald Golledge, Klatzky played a major part in the development of the UCSB Personal Guided System, a GPS-based navigation system for the blind. The impact of Klatzky's research in psychology and human-computer interaction has been recognized by numerous organizations, and she has been elected as a fellow in the American Psychological Association, the Association for Psychological Science, the Society of Experimental Psychologists and the American Association for the Advancement of Science. She has been awarded the Humboldt Senior Research Award from the Alexander von Humboldt Foundation and the Kurt-Koffka medal from the Justus-Liebig-University of Giessen, Germany. Prior to working at CMU, Klatzky was employed at the University of California, Santa Barbara.

Klatzky is a member of the Center for the Neural Basis of Cognition and the Human-Computer Interaction Institute at CMU. She has also completed editorial work for a number of prestigious journals in cognitive and perceptual psychology, including IEEE, Acta Psychologica and Perception and Psychophysics, and she is listed in Outstanding Scientists of the 20th Century.

Selected works

External links
Roberta Klatzky's Biography - CMU Department of Psychology
Roberta Klatzky's Lab
Roberta Klatzky's CV
Roberta Klatzky's Google Scholar profile
The UCSB Personal Guided System
Scholarpedia page for Roberta Klatzky

21st-century American psychologists
American women psychologists
Fellows of the Society of Experimental Psychologists
Fellows of the American Association for the Advancement of Science
University of California, Santa Barbara faculty
Carnegie Mellon University faculty
University of Michigan College of Literature, Science, and the Arts alumni
Stanford University alumni
1947 births
Living people
Fellows of the Cognitive Science Society
20th-century American psychologists